Wouter Vermeersch (born 8 November, 1984, Courtrai) is a Belgian politician from Flanders for the Vlaams Belang party and a member of the Chamber of Representatives.

Biography
Vermeersch studied a degree in engineering at the University of Antwerp and worked as a professional manager of companies specializing in green energy

He first became involved in politics when he joined the LDD party led by Jean-Marie Dedecker and helped to set up the LDD's youth wing JongLibertairen. During the 2007 Belgian regional elections he stood as a candidate for the LDD in the Flemish Parliament but was not elected. In 2017 Vermeersch left LDD and became an adviser to the Europe of Nations and Freedom group in the European Parliament and subsequently joined Vlaams Belang. Since January 2019, he has been a councilor in Courtrai where he is also the leader of the VB's local chapter. In the federal elections in May 2019, Vermeersch was elected to the Chamber of Representatives and headed the VB's list for the West Flanders constituency.

References 

Members of the Belgian Federal Parliament
Living people
Libertair, Direct, Democratisch politicians
Vlaams Belang politicians
1984 births
University of Antwerp alumni
Flemish politicians
Belgian libertarians